Macrolophus brevicornis is a species of plant bug in the family Miridae.

References

Further reading

External links

 

Dicyphini